Spring Hill is a census-designated place (CDP) in Hernando County, Florida, United States. The population was 113,568 at the 2020 census, up from 98,621 at the 2010 census. Spring Hill belongs to Florida's Nature Coast region and is in the Tampa-St. Petersburg-Clearwater metro area. It is east of Hernando Beach, southwest of Brooksville, and north of Tampa.

History and overview
Spring Hill was formerly a large tract of endangered Longleaf Pine Ecosystem and Sand Pine Scrub with very high biodiversity, and a safe haven for many imperiled species, and most of it remained unchanged until the 1970’s with large scale deforestation. It first appeared on Hernando County maps as early as 1856 along what is today Fort Dade Avenue just north of the community of Wiscon. The modern Spring Hill was founded in 1967 as a planned community, which was developed by the Deltona Corporation and the Mackle Brothers. The developers originally wanted to call the community Spring Lake and used that as the working name through the development process. They were forced to use a different name due to the name Spring Lake already being in use locally and chose Spring Hill. The plans for the community are identical to the community of Deltona. The Mackle Brothers sold many of the properties and land in the area through intense advertising. It has since become a sprawling semi-city in its own right, though it is an unincorporated area. The main entrance to the original development is marked by the Spring Hill waterfall on Spring Hill Drive and U.S. Route 19 (Commercial Way).

Spring Hill's proximity to Tampa,  to the south, and the completion of the Suncoast Parkway in 2001 have made the community easily accessible to the Tampa-St. Petersburg area.

Geography
Spring Hill is located in southwestern Hernando County at  (28.478929, & 82.547732). It is bordered to the west by Timber Pines; to the north by Weeki Wachee, North Weeki Wachee, High Point, Brookridge, and Wiscon; and to the east by South Brooksville, Garden Grove, and Masaryktown. To the south it is bordered by Shady Hills and Heritage Pines in Pasco County.

The U.S. Postal Service recommends that "Spring Hill" be used as the mailing address for ZIP Code 34610 in neighboring Pasco County. The Spring Hill CDP does not extend into Pasco County; instead, this mailing area is partially covered by the Shady Hills and Quail Ridge CDPs.

Demographics

At the 2010 census, there were 98,621 people, 39,078 households and 27,798 families residing in the CDP. There were 44,435 housing units, of which 5,357, or 12.1%, were vacant. The racial makeup of the CDP was 88.1% White, 5.1% African American, 0.4% Native American, 1.4% Asian, 0.04% Native Hawaiian or Pacific Islander, 2.5% some other race, and 2.5% from two or more races. Hispanic or Latino of any race were 13.6% of the population.

Of the 39,078 households, 29.8% had children under the age of 18 living with them, 53.6% were headed by married couples living together, 12.9% had a female householder with no husband present, and 28.9% were non-families. 23.1% of all households were made up of individuals, and 12.3% were someone living alone who was 65 years of age or older. The average household size was 2.49, and the average family size was 2.91.

In the CDP, 21.6% of the population were under the age of 18, 7.2% were from 18 to 24, 21.9% were from 25 to 44, 27.1% were from 45 to 64, and 22.2% were 65 years of age or older. The median age was 44.3 years. For every 100 females there were 90.4 males. For every 100 females age 18 and over, there were 87.7 males.

For the period 2013-17, the estimated median annual household income in the CDP was $45,468, and the median family income was $53,017. Male full-time workers had a median income of $39,478 versus $35,059 for females. The per capita income for the CDP was $22,349. About 10.7% of families and 14.9% of the total population were below the poverty line, including 22.6% of those under age 18 and 9.6% of those age 65 or over.

Languages
For the period 2013-17, English spoken as a first language accounted for 85.7% of the population, while 14.3% spoke other languages as their mother tongue. The most significant were Spanish speakers who made up 10.0% of the population.

Education
Spring Hill has many schools, both public and private, which provide primary and secondary education to local children. There are also several options for higher education that are easily accessible from the Spring Hill area.

Primary and secondary education
Public schools in Spring Hill are part of the Hernando County School Board school system, which oversees all public schools in Hernando County. The main public schools that serve the Spring Hill area are:

High schools

 Central High School
 Frank W. Springstead High School, an IB World School
 Nature Coast Technical High School
 Weeki Wachee High School
 Hernando High School

Middle schools

 Fox Chapel Middle School
 Gulf Coast Academy of Science and Technology, a charter school
 Powell Middle School
 West Hernando Middle School

K-8 schools

 Challenger K-8 School of Science and Mathematics
 Explorer K-8
 John D. Floyd K-8 School of Environmental Science
 Winding Waters K-8

Elementary schools

 Chocachatti Elementary School
 Deltona Elementary School
 Pine Grove Elementary School
 Spring Hill Elementary school
 Suncoast Elementary School
 Westside Elementary School

In addition to the public schools in Spring Hill, there are several private schools:
 Growing In Grace Preschool
 Notre Dame Catholic School (Pre-K to grade 8)
 Spring Hill Christian Academy (Pre-K to grade 12)
 Wider Horizons School, a Montessori school (Pre-K to grade 6) and College Preparatory school (junior and senior high school)
 West Hernando Christian School

Higher learning
Spring Hill is home to the  Spring Hill Campus of Pasco–Hernando State College. This was the fourth campus built out of the five now in existence.

Libraries
The Hernando County Library System  operates several libraries in and around the Spring Hill area, such as the West Hernando Branch Library and the Spring Hill Branch Library, which serves as a replacement of the Little Red Schoolhouse Branch Library.  The historic Little Red Schoolhouse Branch Library has since been converted into a bookstore, run by the Friends of the Library, whose proceeds benefit the library system.

Healthcare
There are three accredited hospitals in the area, Bayfront Health Spring Hill Hospital, Oak Hill Hospital and the newest, Bayfront Health Brooksville Hospital. With a large senior citizen population, Spring Hill contains many nursing homes and rehabilitation facilities including Spring Hill Health and Rehab, Evergreen Woods Assisted Living Facility and Health South Rehab (an affiliate of Oak Hill Hospital). Bayfront Health Spring Hill and Oak Hill Hospital offer obstetrical services.

Tourism
Nearby Weeki Wachee Springs is home to the famous live mermaid show and Florida's only spring-fed water park, Buccaneer Bay.

Media
There are two print newspapers that serve the area: the Hernando Times (a publication of Tampa Bay Times), and the Hernando Sun.

Spring Hill belongs in the Tampa Bay Area media market, the 12th largest designated market area in the United States.

Notable people
 Douglas Applegate, member of the United States House of Representatives
 Matt Breida, running back for the New York Giants
 Ricou Browning, film director, actor (notably as the "Gill-man" in Creature from the Black Lagoon), producer, screenwriter, underwater cinematographer, stuntman
 Corey Hill, former UFC fighter and The Ultimate Fighter 5 contestant (deceased)
 Zachary James, opera singer, stage and TV actor (notably as "Lurch" in the Broadway production of The Addams Family)
 Willie Sutton, bank robber
 Huey Whittaker, wide receiver for the Florida Tuskers of the United Football League (UFL)

Transportation

Mass transit
Public transit in Spring Hill is provided by Hernando County Transit (The Bus), which consists of four routes which serve Spring Hill and Brooksville, and which also provides a connection to the Pasco County Bus System (PCPT) via the Purple Route's terminus in Hudson. The Bus system operates six days a week since expanding to include Saturday service in October 2019.

The four current routes are:

 Purple: Pasco-Hernando State College - Brooksville to Spring Hill, final stop in Hudson, where it connects to Pasco County Transit (PCPT) Route 21
 Green: Brooksville US 41 & Wiscon Road via Wiscon Rd, California St and Spring Hill Drive to Pasco-Hernando State College Spring Hill Campus
 Red: Mariner & Northcliffe Boulevards via Northcliffe, Deltona, & Forest Oaks Boulevards, as well as US 19 to Pasco-Hernando State College Spring Hill Campus
 Blue: Brooksville Walmart (SR50) via Mariner Blvd to Bayfront Health Spring Hill (near Mariner Blvd & County Line Road)

Additionally, paratransit services are available via Trans-Hernando, which offers door-to-door services by advance reservation for the elderly, mentally challenged, and economic/transportation disadvantaged residents of Hernando County.

Roads

There are several county roads in Spring Hill that serve as major thoroughfares for traffic traveling around and passing through Spring Hill. Below is a list of the county roads that pertain to Spring Hill:

Highways
Spring Hill is bordered to the west by US 19 (named Commercial Way), and to the north by SR 50 (named Cortez Boulevard). The Suncoast Parkway (SR 589) is a toll road that passes through Spring Hill and serves as a connection to Pasco and Hillsborough counties (and, by extension, Tampa) to the south.

Gallery

References

External links

 Hernando County Chamber of Commerce

Census-designated places in Hernando County, Florida
Census-designated places in Florida
Planned communities in Florida
1856 establishments in Florida